The Korean Labor Unions Confederation (KLUC), also known as Gukmin-nochong (acronym for KLUC in Korean language) was a national trade union centre of South Korea established in 2011, and the union merged into Federation of Korean Trade Unions in 2014.

See also 
 Korean Confederation of Trade Unions (KCTU)
 Federation of Korean Trade Unions (FKTU)
 Trade unions in South Korea

External links 
 The official website, Korean Labor Unions Confederation 

Trade unions established in 2011
2011 establishments in South Korea
2014 disestablishments in South Korea
Organizations based in Seoul
Defunct trade unions in South Korea
Trade unions disestablished in 2014